Middle French is a historical division of the French language that covers the period from the 14th to the 16th century. It is a period of transition during which:
 the French language became clearly distinguished from the other competing Oïl languages, which are sometimes subsumed within the concept of Old French
 the French language was imposed as the official language of the Kingdom of France in place of Latin and other Oïl and Occitan languages
 the literary development of French prepared the vocabulary and grammar for the Classical French spoken in the 17th and 18th centuries.
It is the first version of French that is largely intelligible to Modern French speakers, contrary to Old French.

History

The most important change found in Middle French is the complete disappearance of the noun declension system (already underway for centuries).  There is no longer a distinction between nominative and oblique forms of nouns, and plurals are indicated simply with an s.  This transformation necessitates an increased reliance on the order of words in the sentence, which becomes more or less the syntax of modern French (although there is a continued reliance on the verb in the second position of a sentence, or "verb-second structure", until the 16th century).

Among the elites, Latin was still the language of education, administration, and bureaucracy; this changed in 1539, with the Ordinance of Villers-Cotterêts, in which François I made French alone the language for legal acts.  Regional differences were still extreme throughout France: in the south of France, Occitan languages dominated; in east central France, Franco-Provençal languages were predominant; while, in the north of France, Oïl languages other than Francien continued to be spoken.

The fascination with classical texts led to numerous borrowings from Latin and Greek.  Numerous neologisms based on Latin roots were introduced, and some scholars modified the spelling of French words to bring them into conformity with their Latin roots, sometimes erroneously. This often produced a radical difference between a word's spelling and the way it was pronounced. Nevertheless, Middle French spelling was overall fairly close to the pronunciation; unlike modern French, word-final consonants were still pronounced (though they were optionally lost when they preceded another consonant in the beginning of an immediately following word).

The French wars in Italy and the presence of Italians in the French court brought the French into contact with Italian humanism. These tendencies would continue through Classical French.

There were also some borrowings from Spanish and German and from the Americas.

The influence of the Anglo-Norman language on English had left words of French and Norman origin in England. Some words of Romance origin now found their way back into French as doublets through war and trading contacts.

Also, the meaning and usage of many words from Old French were transformed.

Spelling and punctuation in this period are extremely variable.  The introduction of printing in 1470 highlighted the need for reform in spelling.  One proposed reform came from Jacques Peletier du Mans, who developed a phonetic spelling system and introduced new typographic signs (1550); but this attempt at spelling reform was not followed.

This period saw the publication of the first French grammars and of the French-Latin dictionary of Robert Estienne (1539).

At the beginning of the 17th century, French would see the continued unification of French, the suppression of certain forms, and the prescription of rules, leading to Classical French.

Phonological history

Literature

Notes

References
 Larousse dictionnaire du moyen français. Paris: Larousse, 1992.
 H. Bonnard.  Notions de style, de versificiation et d'histoire de la langue française. Paris: SUDEL, 1953.
 W. von Wartburg.  Évolution et structure de la langue française. Berne (Switzerland): Francke A.G., 1946.

External links
 Dictionnaire du Moyen Français

History of the French language
French, 2
Languages attested from the 14th century